Thwaytes may refer to:

Surnames 
Ann Thwaytes (1789–1866) English philanthropist also known as Mrs. Thwaites, Ann Thwaites and Mrs. Thwaytes
Robert Thwaytes, 15th-century English academic administrator, also known as Thwayts and Thwaits

See also 
Thwaites (disambiguation)